Desertcreat is a parish and a townland in County Tyrone, Northern Ireland. The civil parish of Desertcreat is in the eastern part of County Tyrone in the barony Dungannon Upper, immediately south of the parish of Derryloran, which contains the town of Cookstown, and immediately north of the parish of Pomeroy. The parish has a Church of Ireland Church in the townland of Desertcreat (OS ref:H813733). Patrick Donnelley, the Roman Catholic Bishop who was known as Phelim Brady or the 'Bard of Armagh', is buried in the church graveyard.

It contains the following townlands:
Allen, Annaghananam, Annaghmore, Annaghquin, Annaghteige, Annahavil, Ballymully Glebe, Ballynacroy, Ballynakilly, Bardahessiagh, Cady, Carnenny, Cross Glebe, Derrygortanea, Derryhash, Derryraghan, Desertcreat, Donaghrisk, Downs, Drumballyhugh, Drummillard, Drumraw, Edendoit, Finvey, Galcussagh, Gortacar (Doris), Gortacar (Glassy), Gortagowan, Gortavale, Gortavilly, Gortfad, Gortfad Glebe, Gortindarragh, Grange, Killycolp, Killygarvan, Killyneedan, Kiltyclay, Kiltyclogher, Knockavaddy, Lammy, Legacurry, Lime Hill, Lisnanane, Low Cross, Moneygaragh, Morree, Moymore, Moynagh, Mullaghshantullagh, Mullynure, Oughterard, Pomeroy, Rockdale, Sessiagh (Lindesay), Sessiagh (Scott), Shivey, Skenahergny, Skenarget, Tirnaskea, Tirnaskea (Bayly), Tolvin and Tullaghoge.

Desertcreat Townland
The townland is situated in the historic barony of Dungannon Upper and the civil parish of Desertcreat and covers an area of 123 acres.

The population of the townland declined during the 19th century:

See also
List of townlands of County Tyrone
List of civil parishes of County Tyrone

References

External links
Desertcreat Church of Ireland - Photographs

 
Townlands of County Tyrone